Boone Road Historic District is a national historic district located at Eden, Rockingham County, North Carolina. It encompasses 32 contributing buildings and 1 contributing structure in a residential section of the town of Eden.  It was developed from about 1895 to about 1935, and includes notable examples of Queen Anne, American Foursquare, and I-house style architecture.  Notable buildings include the Wade-Collins House (c. 1897), Willis-Huggins House, Austin House, Ray-McCallum House, McCollum-Truslow House, Clark House (1919), Knight House (1919), and Claude Jones House.

It was listed on the National Register of Historic Places in 1987.

References

Historic districts on the National Register of Historic Places in North Carolina
Queen Anne architecture in North Carolina
Buildings and structures in Rockingham County, North Carolina
National Register of Historic Places in Rockingham County, North Carolina